John Mansell  (1859–1925) was a 19th-century Major League Baseball player. He played outfield for the 1882 Philadelphia Athletics in the American Association. His brothers Mike and Tom also played professional baseball.

External links

1859 births
1925 deaths
Sportspeople from Auburn, New York
19th-century baseball players
Baseball players from New York (state)
Major League Baseball outfielders
Philadelphia Athletics (AA) players
Washington Nationals (minor league) players
Albany (minor league baseball) players
East Saginaw Grays players
Saginaw Greys players
Albany Senators players
Binghamton Bingoes players
Chattanooga Lookouts players